{{DISPLAYTITLE:Richard Kelly (The Tuam Herald)}}

Richard John Kelly (1810–1884) was an Irish journalist and the founder of The Tuam Herald.

Kelly was a native of Loughrea, County Galway, and launched The Tuam Herald newspaper on 13 May 1837; it has been in continuous publication ever since. He was the proprietor and editor until succeeded by his son, Jasper, who was a journalist. Jasper died in his thirties, leaving a young family, and Richard resumed management of the paper on behalf of his grandchildren.

References
 The District of Loughrea: Vol. I History 1791-1918, p. 144.

External links
 http://www.tuamherald.ie/
 https://web.archive.org/web/20090507181204/http://www.loughreahistory.com/more_book1.html
 Richard Kelly (1810–1884) at the Dictionary of Irish Biography

1810 births
1884 deaths
Irish newspaper founders
People from Loughrea
The Tuam Herald people
19th-century Irish businesspeople